Gorzyca or Górzyca may refer to the following places in Poland:
Gorzyca, Lower Silesian Voivodeship (south-west Poland)
Gorzyca, Lubusz Voivodeship (west Poland)
Górzyca, Lubusz Voivodeship
Gorzyca, West Pomeranian Voivodeship (north-west Poland)
Górzyca, West Pomeranian Voivodeship